The Stelli is a mountain of the Plessur Alps, overlooking Langwies in the canton of Graubünden. It lies west of the Weissfluh.

References

External links
 Stelli on Hikr

Mountains of the Alps
Mountains of Graubünden
Mountains of Switzerland
Two-thousanders of Switzerland